Garac may refer to:

 Garač, a mountain in central Montenegro
 Garac, France